Charles Eugène de Croÿ (tr. ; 1651) was a German and Russian Field Marshal and nobleman from the French noble House of Croÿ.

Biography
His father was Jacques Philippe de Croÿ-Roeulx (1614–1685), a descendant of Jean III of Croy-Roeulx, son of Antoine le Grand. His mother was Johanna Catharina van Bronckhorst, daughter of Field Marshal Johann Jakob van Bronckhorst.

He married Wilhelmina Juliana van den Bergh, daughter of Hendrik van den Bergh, who was 13 years his senior. They had no children.

Croÿ joined the Danish army during the Scanian War and was first a volunteer officer but was relatively quickly made a colonel for his bravery. He participated in the 1676 Battle of Lund and the siege of Malmö in June 1677 when he was seriously wounded. In November of that same year, he had recovered from his injuries and was nominated governor of the city of Landskrona which was the main Danish stronghold during the entire war. Unfortunately, he became quite unpopular because of his grand, continental manners and was replaced by Hans Wilhelm von Meerheim less than a month later. 

Later on, he fought with success in the Austrian army against the Ottoman Turks and participated in both the liberation of Vienna in 1683 and the attack on Belgrade in 1690. On October 18. 1692, he laid the foundation stone of the Petrovaradin Fortress and was promoted to Imperial Field Marshal for his services.

In 1697, he started serving the Russian Tsar, Peter the Great, and commanded his forces in Livonia (Livonia at this time formed part of Sweden and the Polish Commonwealth). He led the Russian forces in the Battle of Narva on 20 November 1700 when he surrendered and was taken prisoner by the Swedes.

He died in Reval (Tallinn) as a prisoner of war in 1702.  On demand of his creditors, his body, which rested at St. Nicholas Church, was not buried for more than 190 years, and, when mummified, was exhibited as a curiosity.

References

Bibliography

1651 births
1702 deaths
People from Le Rœulx
Charles Eugene
Field marshals of the Holy Roman Empire
Field marshals of Russia
Russian military personnel of the Great Northern War
Mummies